The McMechen Lockmaster Houses on the Ohio River, also known as the Ohio River Lock & Dam No. 13, were a set of two historic homes located at McMechen, Marshall County, West Virginia. They were built by the Army Corps of Engineers in 1910, to house the lockmaster's family and engineer.  They were set side by side and are mirror images of each other.  They were 2½ stories high, with a brick first floor and aggregate stucco above in the Tudor Revival style.  They feature vertical wood half-timbering, angled on the gable ends.

They were listed on the National Register of Historic Places in 1992.

References

Houses on the National Register of Historic Places in West Virginia
Tudor Revival architecture in West Virginia
Houses completed in 1910
Houses in Marshall County, West Virginia
National Register of Historic Places in Marshall County, West Virginia